Franklin Community Schools is a school district headquartered in Franklin, Indiana.

It serves almost all of Franklin. A small section of Bargersville is within the school district.

Schools
 Franklin Community High School
 Franklin Community Middle School
 Custer Baker Intermediate School
Elementary schools
 Creekside
 Needham
 Northwood
 Union
 Webb

References

External links
 Franklin Community Schools

School districts in Indiana
Education in Johnson County, Indiana